Sagaai is a 1966 Bollywood film starring Rajshree and Biswajeet.

Plot
Sheel (Rajshree) and Kailash's (Prem Chopra) marriage is planned by Sheel's father. But fate takes her into the arms of Rajesh (Biswajeet), and they celebrate their engagement on Sheel's birthday. Rajesh meets with a car accident, conspired by  Kailash, and is paralyzed waist down. Rai Sahebh refuses to acknowledge their engagement but Sheel adamantly leaves her home to be with the ailing Rajesh and marries him by Vedic rituals. She nurses him back to health, but is rudely preyed upon by Kailash, who wants to see the end of Rajesh. The film reflects upon the trails and travails of a woman whose husband is ill and paralyzed and she is desired by another man. A very beautiful dance number is performed by Sheel as Visha Kanya, very much before her life is thrown in such a turmoil.

Cast
Biswajit as Rajesh
Rajshree as Sheel
Prem Chopra as Kailash
Rehman as Dr. Tandon
Jayant as Dwarkanath
Raj Mehra as Rai Sahib Raghu Prasad (Sheel's Father)
Durga Khote as Sheel's Mother
Rajendra Nath as Hariram 'Harry'
Asit Sen as Bansi
Tun Tun as Miss Anarkali
Iftekhar as Hospital Doctor
Helen as Dancer / Singer

Soundtrack
Music is composed by Ravi, while Rajinder Krishan wrote the songs.

External links

memsaabstory

1966 films
1960s Hindi-language films
Films scored by Ravi